In enzymology, a platelet-activating factor acetyltransferase is an enzyme that catalyzes the chemical reaction

1-alkyl-2-acetyl-sn-glycero-3-phosphocholine + 1-organyl-2-lyso-sn-glycero-3-phospholipid  1-organyl-2-lyso-sn-glycero-3-phosphocholine + 1-alkyl-2-acetyl-sn-glycero-3-phospholipid

Thus, the two substrates of this enzyme are 1-alkyl-2-acetyl-sn-glycero-3-phosphocholine and 1-organyl-2-lyso-sn-glycero-3-phospholipid, whereas its two products are 1-organyl-2-lyso-sn-glycero-3-phosphocholine and 1-alkyl-2-acetyl-sn-glycero-3-phospholipid.

This enzyme belongs to the family of transferases, specifically those acyltransferases transferring groups other than aminoacyl groups.  The systematic name of this enzyme class is 1-alkyl-2-acyl-sn-glycero-3-phosphocholine:1-organyl-2-lyso-sn-glyce ro-3-phospholipid acetyltransferase. This enzyme is also called PAF acetyltransferase.

References 

 

EC 2.3.1
Enzymes of unknown structure